Konstantinos Foufoulas (Greek: Κωνσταντίνος Φούφουλας; born 25 October 1984) is a Greek footballer. He plays either as a centre back or as a defensive midfielder with equal success.

External links
Kostas Foufoulas' Profile in the Official site of Iraklis FC
Foufoulas' Statistics 
Profile at epae.org

1984 births
Living people
Greek footballers
Greece youth international footballers
Greece under-21 international footballers
Patraikos F.C. players
Panachaiki F.C. players
A.O. Kerkyra players
Iraklis Thessaloniki F.C. players
Olympiacos Volos F.C. players
Ilioupoli F.C. players
Super League Greece players
Association football defenders
Footballers from Patras